The Karon or Kalɔɔn language is an endangered language of Senegal and Gambia.  It belongs to the Bak branch of the Niger–Congo language family, and is particularly closely related to the Mlomp language.

Karon is spoken in a coastal area north of the mouth of the Casamance River. A person is called alɔɔn in the language, and speakers refer to their own language as kägup kɔlɔɔnay.

Phonology

Consonants

Vowels 

Advanced tongue root is marked with an acute accent /á/.

References

External links
 Karon entry in the UNESCO Red Book of Endangered Languages

Jola languages
Languages of the Gambia
Endangered languages of Africa
Languages of Senegal